{{DISPLAYTITLE:Phi2 Lupi}}

Phi2 Lupi, Latinized from φ2 Lupi, is a solitary star in the southern constellation of Lupus. With an apparent magnitude of 4.535, it is bright enough to be seen with the naked eye. Based upon an annual parallax shift of 6.28 mas as seen from Earth, it is located around 520 light years from the Sun. At that distance, the visual magnitude of the star is diminished by an extinction factor of  due to interstellar dust. It is a member of the Upper Centaurus–Lupus subgroup of the Scorpius–Centaurus association.

This is an ordinary B-type main sequence star with a stellar classification of B4 V. It has an estimated 6.1 times the mass of the Sun and about 3.4 times the Sun's radius. The star is roughly 40 million years and is spinning with a projected rotational velocity of 141 km/s. It is radiating about 800 times the solar luminosity from its photosphere at an effective temperature of 16,780 K.

References

B-type main-sequence stars
Lupus (constellation)
Lupi, Phi2
136664
075304
5712
Durchmusterung objects
Upper Centaurus Lupus